Arantza or Arantxa is a Basque feminine given name,  meaning "thornbush".
It is a hypocoristic for Our Lady of Arantzazu, a shrine of Mary, mother of Jesus, in Gipuzkoa.

People with the name Arantxa include:

Tennis 

 Arantxa Parra Santonja
 Arantxa Sánchez Vicario
 Arantxa Rus

Other 
 Arantxa Castilla-La Mancha
 Arantxa King
 Arantxa Ochoa
 Arantxa Urretavizcaya

References 

Basque feminine given names
Feminine given names